Prosperity Baptist Church is a historic church on Arkansas Highway 8 West in the rural community of Ramsey, Arkansas, located in central Dallas County.  The single-story Plain Traditional wood-frame church was built in 1904, with a major addition in 1945 giving it its present T shape.  It is a gable roof structure resting on a foundation of concrete piers and petrified wood.  The church was built on land purchased from the Fordyce Lumber Company by a congregation organized in 1902.  It is the only surviving building from Ramsey's early days.

The church was listed on the National Register of Historic Places in 2003.

See also
National Register of Historic Places listings in Dallas County, Arkansas

References

Baptist churches in Arkansas
Churches on the National Register of Historic Places in Arkansas
Churches completed in 1904
Churches in Dallas County, Arkansas
National Register of Historic Places in Dallas County, Arkansas